CCTRL is a call control XML, not to be confused with the W3C standard CCXML. CCTRL allows web developers to create telephony services that run on Lignup, Inc.'s software communications platform. CCTRL is often used in hosted telephony applications.  CCTRL can be practically applied in call initiation, management, and termination services.

Features 
CCTRL enables developers to perform call control and media processing via XML. Unique features of LignUp's CCTRL platform include its ability to handle events asynchronously, contributing additional stability to servers that receive many requests at once. CCTRL is open standards, written in a non-proprietary markup language. Currently, CCTRL supports call initiation, call termination, and voice application initiation.

Origin 
The term CCTRL originated from its first use as core part of the LignUp Communications Platform, a native-SIP based communications system that leverages CCTRL and MCTRL to deliver web services content.

External links
http://www.lignup.com

XML